Nordost is a borough of the city of Wiesbaden, Hesse, Germany. With over 22,000 inhabitants, it is one of the most-populated of Wiesbaden's boroughs. It is located in the centre of the city. Nordost is known as the borough with the highest housing prices in Wiesbaden. Besides this Nordost has the highest purchasing power per inhabitant of all boroughs with about 29,000 Euro per inhabitant.

References

Sources 
 Derived from German Wikipedia

External links 
 Official Wiesbaden-Nordost website (in German)

Boroughs of Wiesbaden